Wolnościowcy, variously translated as Freedomites, Liberalists, Liberals, and Libertarians, is a Polish political party created by former KORWiN members who at first remained within the Confederation Liberty and Independence coalition and parliamentary group, then left on 13 February 2023, following Artur Dziambor being kicked out of the Confederation by the party court.  Artur Dziambor was selected as a president of the party, while Jakub Kulesza, Tomasz Grabarczyk and Marek Kułakowski became vice-presidents.

Ideology
The party is liberal in the sphere of economy. Socially the party focuses on direct democracy and personal liberties, proposing drug liberalization, unrestricted freedom of speech, right to keep and bear arms, and electronic voting.

References

External links
Official website

2022 establishments in Poland
Political parties established in 2022

Confederation Liberty and Independence